William Fawell was Archdeacon of Totnes during 1557.

References

Archdeacons of Totnes
16th-century English clergy